Croron Mein Khel (CMK)is a Pakistani gameshow aired on BOL Entertainment. Its first host was Nadia Khan. It is one of the most famous gameshows in Pakistan. Its slogan is "Kyunke yeh khel hai croron ka" (English: Because This Game is of Millions). It is now hosted by Maria Wasti.

History 
The first episode of CMK was on 6 December 2018 (five days after BOL Entertainment Release). The first episode was with Reema Khan.

Episodes

References

External links 
Official website

Pakistani game shows
2018 Pakistani television series debuts